Sapanca is a town and district in the Sakarya Province in the Marmara region of Turkey near Lake Sapanca. The town's mayor is Özcan ÖZEN (AKP).

Sapanca has recently become a tourist destination, due to its stunning natural environment and its lake, called Sapanca Gölü, as well as its proximity to İstanbul and the city of İzmit, also known as Kocaeli. The town has a number of hotels and resorts.

Localities 
 Balkaya

References

External links
District governor's official website
District municipality's official website

Populated places in Sakarya Province
Districts of Sakarya Province
Towns in Turkey